Marquess of Villaviciosa de Asturias is a hereditary title in the Peerage of Spain, granted in 1892 by Maria Christina of Austria on behalf of her underage son Alfonso XIII to Pedro José Pidal, in recognition of his services and those of his father, Alejandro Pidal y Mon, President of the Senate of Spain.

Marquesses of Villaviciosa de Asturias (1892)

Pedro Pidal y Bernaldo de Quirós, 1st Marquess of Villaviciosa de Asturias
Santiago Pidal y Guilhou, 2nd Marquess of Villaviciosa de Asturias
Pedro Pidal y Nano, 3rd Marquess of Villaviciosa de Asturias

See also
Spanish nobility

References

Marquesses of Spain
Lists of Spanish nobility